Ever Deadly is a Canadian documentary film, directed by Chelsea McMullan and Tanya Tagaq and slated for release in 2022. The film is a portrait of Tagaq's life and career as a musician and activist.

The film premiered at the 2022 Toronto International Film Festival on September 9, 2022.

References

2022 films
2022 documentary films
Canadian documentary films
Documentary films about women in music
Documentary films about Inuit in Canada
Films directed by Chelsea McMullan
2020s Canadian films